Klára Hymlarová (born 27 February 1999) is a Czech ice hockey player and member of the Czech national ice hockey team, currently playing with the St. Cloud State Huskies in the Western Collegiate Hockey Association (WCHA) conference of the NCAA Division I.

She represented the Czech Republic at the IIHF Women's World Championship Top Division tournaments in 2016, 2017, 2019, and 2021 and at the 2015 IIHF Women's World Championship Division I Group A tournament. At the qualification for the women's ice hockey tournament at the 2022 Winter Olympics, she was the Czech Republic's second leading scorer, tallying 3 goals and 3 assists in three games, as the team qualified to participate in the Olympic Games for the first time in history. As a junior player with the Czech national under-18 team, she participated in the IIHF Women's U18 World Championships in 2015, 2016, and served as team captain for the 2017 tournament.

References

External links
 
 Klára Hymlárová at Hokej.cz 

1999 births
Living people
Czech women's ice hockey forwards
Czech expatriate ice hockey players in Canada
Czech expatriate ice hockey players in the United States
Ice hockey players at the 2022 Winter Olympics
Olympic ice hockey players of the Czech Republic
Sportspeople from Opava
St. Cloud State Huskies women's ice hockey players